Philip and the Others is a 1954 novel by Dutch writer Cees Nooteboom. It was Nooteboom's first novel. He wrote the first chapter when working in a bank, sent it to a publisher, and was offered 300 guilders to finish the book, which then took two months. The book won the Anne Frank Prize.

See also
 1954 in literature
 Dutch literature

References

1954 novels
Dutch-language novels
20th-century Dutch novels
Novels by Cees Nooteboom